Tom Boswell (30 August 1943, in Simla – 19 November 1990, in Reading) was a journalist who worked in both BBC Radio and Television.

In radio he contributed to the highly successful Radio Four series Going Places and the Saturday morning programme Breakaway.

As a television presenter he contributed items for Top Gear. He presented two episodes in 1981 and 1982, and then appeared in twenty episodes between 1988 and his death in 1990. His specialties on Top Gear included safety and economy topics such as the new Merritt engine and protection against car theft.  Boswell also reviewed motorcycles during the show.

External links

References 

British television presenters
1943 births
1990 deaths
Top Gear people
People from Shimla